The Kalgoorlie Hotel is a historic hotel in Kalgoorlie, Western Australia.

Location
It is located at 319 Hannan Street, Kalgoorlie.  It has also been known as Judds Pub.

History
Designed in the Federation architectural style, it was built from 1890 to 1915.

References

Hotels in Kalgoorlie-Boulder
Federation style architecture
Hannan Street, Kalgoorlie